Dusit is a Thai given name. Notable people with the name include:

 Dusit Chalermsan (born 1970), Thai football player and coach
 , Singapore-based computer engineer

Thai masculine given names